Robert Allen  was a Northumberland born farmer and poet.

Life 
Allen completed his military service, and after gaining farm experience at a farm near Prendwick (11 miles west of Alnwick), Northumberland, moved in 1950 to Redesmouth Farm, Redesmouth, near Bellingham, which was owned by his father Colonel Allen of Haydon Bridge.

When he retired, he and his wife Angela, moved into a new house named "The Glebe" in Bellingham. Robert had always had an interest in his local dialect, which he called "Big hoose terk", the gentle and polite dialect used when talking to the vicar, rather than the more common and normal "village talk" and also in poetry, and his retirement allowed him the time to put the two together and write down the results.

He then produced three audio tapes of his poems "The Canniest Place on Earth", "Ridin' High" and "The Lang Pack", and eventually, in 1994, he published the whole in a book Canny Bit Verse, illustrated by local poet/illustrator and neighbouring farmer Henry Brewis.

Both Robert Allen and his wife died in the early 2000s.

Works

Poems 
Bonnie North Tyne
Canny Welcome (A)
Cautionary Tale (A)
Corbie Crow (The)
Costly chimney cowl (The)
End O’ Lambin Day
Grittor (The)
Lot Of It Aboot (A)
Owld Farmor’s Advice (The)
Owld Men’s Thowts
Spuggies
Whee’s Deed Collum (The)

Prose 
God’s Bairn A Northumbrian version of the Christmas story

Collection 
Canny Bit Verse  The contents of three audio cassettes of Northumbrian dialect verse translated into a single book of poems, which between them praise the valley of the North Tyne, talk about local village cricket, or tell of sad occurrences as in the whee's deid (obituary) column, and according to the sales details "and for those who don't know their cushat (wood pigeon) from their shavie (chaffinch), there's a glossary of dialect words"

See also 
Geordie dialect words
Canny Bit Verse
The Northumbria Anthology
Henry Brewis

References

External links
 Canny Bit Verse

English male poets
People from Bellingham, Northumberland
2000s deaths
20th-century births
Year of birth missing
Geordie songwriters
20th-century English male writers